Gowdeyana is a genus of flies in the family Stratiomyidae.

Species
Gowdeyana albipilosa James, 1980
Gowdeyana argentea (James, 1967)
Gowdeyana mirabilis Curran, 1928
Gowdeyana punctifera (Malloch, 1915)
Gowdeyana ryckmani (James, 1965)
Gowdeyana varipes James, 1980
Gowdeyana vitrisetosa (Lindner, 1935)

References

Stratiomyidae
Brachycera genera
Taxa named by Charles Howard Curran
Diptera of North America
Diptera of South America